Walter Hart (or Walter Lyhert; died 24 May 1472) was a medieval Bishop of Norwich. He was Provost of Oriel College, Oxford, from 1435 to 1446. He was nominated as bishop on 24 January 1446 and was consecrated on 27 February 1446. He died on 24 May 1472.

The executors of his will are named as William Pykenham, archdeacon of Suffolk, John Bulman, Robert Hober, Henry Smyth, and another (illegible).

He features in the Paston Letters, especially their correspondence in 1469, when he was drawn into the efforts by her mother and brothers to prevent Margery Paston from marrying their bailiff Richard Calle.

Citations

References
 

	

Bishops of Norwich
1472 deaths
Year of birth unknown
15th-century English Roman Catholic bishops
Provosts of Oriel College, Oxford